Driton Dovolani (born July 17, 1973), commonly known as Tony Dovolani is an Albanian-American professional ballroom dancer, instructor and judge. He is known for his involvement in the American version of Dancing with the Stars on ABC. Dovolani also portrayed Slick Willy in the hit film Shall We Dance? and spent time coaching actress Jennifer Lopez.

Early life
Dovolani was born in Pristina, Kosovo to Albanian parents from Debar. He began folk dancing at the age of three. At the age of fifteen, his family moved to Stamford, Connecticut. He got the opportunity to attend classes at a Fred Astaire Dance Academy.

Dancing with the Stars

Dovolani joined the show in its second season and was partnered with professional wrestler Stacy Keibler; they made it to the finals and finished in third place. In Season 3, he was partnered with country music star Sara Evans. Midway through the season, Evans withdrew from the competition for personal reasons. He returned to the show on March 19 for Season 4, this time partnered with talk show host Leeza Gibbons. They were the third couple eliminated from the competition and finished in 9th place.

He competed in Season 5, partnered with actress Jane Seymour. They were the seventh couple eliminated from the competition and finished in sixth place. In Season 6, his partner was Broadway actress Marissa Jaret Winokur. They were eliminated in the semi-finals and finished in fourth place.
Dovolani competed in Season 7 of Dancing with the Stars with actress Susan Lucci of All My Children as his partner. They were eliminated in Week 7 and came in sixth.

In the eighth season, he was originally paired with Nancy O'Dell, the then-host of Access Hollywood. However, on March 5 she withdrew from the competition because of a torn meniscus sustained during pre-season practice. With only two days to practice, Melissa Rycroft, fresh off her The Bachelor appearance, stepped in and became his new celebrity partner. They made it to the finals and took third place in the competition.

In the ninth season, he was partnered with former model and entrepreneur Kathy Ireland. They were the third couple to be eliminated, finishing in 14th place. For Season Ten, Dovolani was partnered with former reality star Kate Gosselin from Jon and Kate Plus 8/Kate Plus 8. They were the fourth couple eliminated, finishing in 8th place.

For the eleventh season, he was partnered with The Hills star Audrina Patridge. They were the sixth couple eliminated, finishing in 7th place. For Season 12, his partner was talk show host Wendy Williams. They were the second couple eliminated, finishing in tenth place. For Season 13, his partner was singer Chynna Phillips. Phillips was eliminated in week four.

For Season 14, his partner was tennis champion Martina Navratilova. They were the first couple to be eliminated. Dovalani was once again partnered with Melissa Rycroft for All-Stars season 15 and they became champions of the season. For season 16, he partnered with country singer Wynonna Judd and were eliminated in the third week of competition. For season 17, he was partnered with actress Leah Remini and finished in 5th place.

For Season 18, he was partnered with Real Housewives of Atlanta star NeNe Leakes, and were eliminated on the seventh week of competition, finishing in seventh place. For season 19, he paired with fashion designer Betsey Johnson. They were eliminated in the fourth week of competition, finishing in tenth place. For season 20, he paired with actress & author Suzanne Somers. They were eliminated on Week 5 and finished in 9th place.

For season 21, he was paired with reality star Kim Zolciak-Biermann. After suffering from a mini stroke, Biermann had to withdraw from the competition during Week 3 because she was not clear to travel.

For season 22, he was partnered with actress Marla Maples. They were eliminated on April 11, 2016, and came in 10th place.

On February 8, 2018, Dovolani revealed that he has officially left Dancing with the Stars.

Performances by the Season

With Stacy Keibler
Average: 27.7

With Sara Evans
Average: 21.0

With Leeza Gibbons
Average: 19.0

With Jane Seymour
Average: 24.5

With Marissa Jaret Winokur
Average: 23.8

With Susan Lucci
Average: 21.3

Score was awarded by stand in judge Michael Flatley.

With Melissa Rycroft
Average: 26.8

With Kathy Ireland
Average: 17.0

Score was awarded by stand in judge Baz Luhrmann.

With Kate Gosselin
Average: 15.5

With Audrina Patridge
Average: 23.0

With Wendy Williams
Average: 15.3

With Chynna Phillips
Average: 22.5
{| class="wikitable"
|-  style="text-align: center; background:#ccc;"
| rowspan="2"|Week #
| rowspan="2"|Dance/Song
| colspan="3"|Judges' score
| rowspan="2"|Result
|-  style="text-align: center; background:#ccc;"
|  style="width:10%; "|Inaba
|  style="width:10%; "|Goodman
|  style="width:10%; "|Tonioli
|-
|  style="text-align: center; background:#faf6f6;"|1
|  style="text-align: center; background:#faf6f6;"|Viennese Waltz / "If I Ain't Got You"
|  style="text-align: center; background:#faf6f6;"|8
|  style="text-align: center; background:#faf6f6;"|7
|  style="text-align: center; background:#faf6f6;"|7
|  style="text-align: center; background:#faf6f6;"|Safe
|-
|  style="text-align: center; background:#faf6f6;"|2
|  style="text-align: center; background:#faf6f6;"|Jive / "The Boy Does Nothing"
|  style="text-align: center; background:#faf6f6;"|7
|  style="text-align: center; background:#faf6f6;"|7
|  style="text-align: center; background:#faf6f6;"|7
|  style="text-align: center; background:#faf6f6;"|Safe
|-
|  style="text-align: center; background:#faf6f6;"|3
|  style="text-align: center; background:#faf6f6;"|Rumba / "Hold On"
|  style="text-align: center; background:#faf6f6;"|8
|  style="text-align: center; background:#faf6f6;"|9
|  style="text-align: center; background:#faf6f6;"|9
|  style="text-align: center; background:#faf6f6;"|Safe
|-
|  style="text-align: center; background:#faf6f6;"|4
|  style="text-align: center; background:#faf6f6;"|Tango / "Theme from Mission: Impossible"
|  style="text-align: center; background:#faf6f6;"|7
|  style="text-align: center; background:#faf6f6;"|7
|  style="text-align: center; background:#faf6f6;"|7
|  style="text-align: center; background:#faf6f6;"|Eliminated
|}

With Martina Navratilova
Average: 18.5

With Melissa Rycroft
Average: 28.0

The additional score of 9.5 was awarded by guest judge Paula Abdul.

With Wynonna Judd
Average: 17.0

With Leah Remini
Average: 24.8

Score was given by guest judge Julianne Hough.
Week 8 score was given by Cher.
The additional score of Week 10 was given by Maksim Chmerkovskiy.

With NeNe Leakes
Average: 23.5

1The additional score of Week 3 was given by Robin Roberts

2For this week only, as part of the "Partner Switch-Up" week, NeNe Leakes did not perform with Dovolani and instead performed with Derek Hough.

3Additional score of Week 4 was given by Julianne Hough

4Additional score of Week 5 was given by Donny Osmond

5Additional score of Week 6 was given by Redfoo

6Additional score of Week 7 was given by Ricky Martin

With Betsey Johnson
Average: 26.5

1 Score given by guest judge Kevin Hart, in place of Goodman.

2The American public scored the dance in place of Goodman with the averaged score being counted alongside the three other judges.

With Suzanne Somers
Average: 26.8

With Kim Zolciak-Biermann
Average: 16.3

With Marla Maples
Average: 20.8

1 Score given by guest judge Zendaya.

Dancing
Ballroom dancing is all about the woman, according to Dovolani. He believes the man is meant to be the frame for the picture of beauty as presented by the woman.

Dovolani and his partner Elena Grinenko have recently retired from competing in the American rhythm division. Prior to his partnership with Elena, he danced with Inna Ivanenko and Lisa Regal.

Achievements
2006 nominated for an Emmy for outstanding choreography for Dancing with the Stars for episode #208 (Dance: Jive).
2006 PBS America's Ballroom Challenge Rhythm Champion
2006 Emerald Ball Open Professional American Rhythm Champion
2006 United States Open Rhythm Champion with Elena Grinenko
2006 World Rhythm Champion with Elena Grinenko
2005 Ohio Star Ball American Rhythm Champion
2005 United States Open Rhythm Champion with Inna Ivanenko
2005 World Rhythm Champion with Inna Ivanenko

Outside of dancing
Tony and Len Goodman appear along with Mary Murphy in an infomercial for the Core Rhythms workout system.

Dovolani and fellow dancers Maksim Chmerkovskiy and Elena Grinenko have created a website called the Ballroom Dance Channel. It is to help bring awareness to dancing. Dovolani and best friend Chmerkovskiy can often be found interviewing each other. The website is called ballroomdancechannel.com

Dovolani is the driving force behind the Superstars of Ballroom Dance Camp, an opportunity for people to learn from celebrity Pros from hit television shows. www.superstarsofballroom.com

Dovolani along with Maksim Chmerkovskiy and Valentin Chmerkovskiy opened Dance with Me Studio in Stamford, CT on April 16, 2012. The Stamford location is the fourth in the chain and the first in Connecticut started by Dovolani, Maksim Chmerkovskiy, Valentin Chmerkovskiy and their partners. The other studios are in Ridgefield, N.J., Long Island, N.Y., and Soho, N.Y. Tony left Dance With Me in middle 2018, to return to Fred Astaire, where he started learning ballroom. 

Personal life
Tony is married to wife Lina, and the couple have 3 children, a daughter named Luana and twins born when Luana was 3 years old. The twins, son Adrian and daughter Ariana, were born on September 8, 2008. Tony met Lina on a blind date in 1998 and proposed to her four hours later. Tony was in the middle of rehearsals for the seventh season of Dancing with the Stars'' with partner Susan Lucci when he got the call that Lina had gone into labor.

See also
Dancesport World Champions (rhythm)
U.S. National Dancesport Champions (Professional Rhythm)
Dancing with the Stars (U.S. TV series)

References

External links

Dancing with the Stars Biography
Tony Dovolani Official MySpace Page

1973 births
American people of Albanian descent
Yugoslav emigrants to the United States
American ballroom dancers
Albanian male dancers
People from Pristina
Dancing with the Stars (American TV series) winners
Living people